Bluff Commando was a light infantry regiment of the South African Army. It formed part of the South African Army Infantry Formation as well as the South African Territorial Reserve.

History

Origin

From Commando to Regiment
Congella Regiment can claim descent from Bluff Commando and other citizen force personnel in the Durban area.

Operations

With the SADF
It was raised in 1980 and its first headquarters was at Bluff Commando HQ on Salisbury Island on the SA Navy Base. The Regiment was later moved to Blamey Road Montclair.

By 1990, Durban Regiment, Congella Regiment and 12 Reception Depot were all placed under command of Group 10. The regimental badge was based on the Inniskilling Fusiliers castle. 

Congella Regiment was deployed to South West Africa on border duties and also participated in numerous deployments within South Africa to combat internal unrest.

Congella Regiment had a unique composition in that it had specialist components such as a tactical support team and dog handlers.

With the SANDF

Disbandment
These units along with all other Commando units was disbanded after a decision by South African President Thabo Mbeki to disband all Commando Units. The Commando system was phased out between 2003 and 2008 "because of the role it played in the apartheid era", according to the Minister of Safety and Security Charles Nqakula.

Leadership

Insignia

Dress Insignia

References

See also 
 South African Commando System

Infantry regiments of South Africa
South African Commando Units
Disbanded military units and formations in Durban